The German Hat Workers' Union (DHAV) was a trade union representing hatters in Germany.

The union was founded on 16 July 1871, although it later gave its official founding date as 1 January 1872.  Initially, it was named the Central Union of German Hatters, and was based in Offenbach am Main.  Membership was initially 1,165, and grew to 2,667 by 1879.  That year, the union was banned under the Anti-Socialist Laws, but the union leaders formed the Hatter's Health and Death Fund to carry on its work, and when the Anti-Socialist Laws were repealed, the union was re-established, as the "German Hat Workers' Union".

The union was a founding constituent of the General German Trade Union Confederation in 1919, and by 1928, it had 18,509 members.  It was banned by the Nazis in 1933.  After World War II, hatters were instead represented by the Textile and Clothing Union.

Presidents
1876: Hermann Kriemichen
1890: Alfred Metzschke
1918: Fritz Siefert
1922: Franz Brösicke

References

Hat makers' trade unions
Trade unions in Germany
Trade unions established in 1871
Trade unions disestablished in 1933